Georges Desplas (30 January 1856 – 29 January 1922) was a French politician. He served as a member of the Chamber of Deputies from 1906 to 1919. He also served as the Minister of Public Works and Transport from 20 March 1917 to 7 September 1917.

References

1856 births
1922 deaths
People from Hautes-Pyrénées
Politicians from Occitania (administrative region)
Independent Radical politicians
French Ministers of Public Works
Transport ministers of France
Members of the 9th Chamber of Deputies of the French Third Republic
Members of the 10th Chamber of Deputies of the French Third Republic
Members of the 11th Chamber of Deputies of the French Third Republic